Cryptocarya laevigata, known as the glossy laurel or red-fruited laurel, is a rainforest plant growing in eastern Australia. The natural range of distribution is rainforest understorey on fertile soils, from the Richmond River, New South Wales to Cairns in tropical Queensland. Often seen in association with the White Booyong.

Description 

The bark is brown and smooth apart from vertical raised bumps.

Leaves alternate, elliptical in shape, smooth edged with a long blunt tip. Glossy above and below. The leaf features a mid rib and two other lateral veins, giving a three veined appearance. Other leaf veins indistinct.

Small, cream, scented flowers form on panicles from October to December. The fruit is an orange or red drupe,  in diameter. The single woody seed is pointed and prominently ribbed, like many other Australian Cryptocarya seeds. The fruit is ripe from to January to May.

Like most Australian Cryptocarya fruit, removal of the slimy red aril is advised to assist seed germination. Roots and shoots usually appear within three to twelve months.

Uses 

The glossy leaves, small size and attractive red fruit make it suitable as an ornamental tree.

References

External links

Trees of Australia
Flora of New South Wales
Flora of Queensland
Laurales of Australia
laevigata
Ornamental trees